Acacia ruppii, commonly known as Rupp's wattle, is a shrub belonging to the genus Acacia and the subgenus Phyllodineae native to eastern Australia. It is listed as endangered in the Environment Protection and Biodiversity Conservation Act 1999.

Description
It has shortly villous branchlets with crowded green phyllodes that have a linear to narrowly oblanceolate or narrowly elliptic shape and can be straight to incurved. It blooms between July and September producing inflorescences with one to seven heads per raceme with simple ones scattered throughout. Following flowering coriaceous, dark brown to blackish seed pods form that have a linear shape but can be curved to various degrees.

Distribution
In Queensland Acacia ruppii is treated as conspecific with Acacia torringtonsis. It is endemic to a large area where it has a scattered distribution extending from the south east of Queensland in the north around Wyberba down to around Torrington in New South Wales in the south where it is found on elevated tablelands growing in sandy granite based soils often as a part of open scrub or woodland communities. In NSW Acacia is considered to be a endemic to the coaldale area in Fortis Creek National Park and Banyabba Nature Reserve. https://plantnet.rbgsyd.nsw.gov.au/cgi-bin/NSWfl.pl?page=nswfl&lvl=sp&name=Acacia~ruppii

See also
 List of Acacia species

References

ruppii
Flora of Queensland
Flora of New South Wales
Plants described in 1912
Taxa named by Joseph Maiden